Hruso, also known as Aka (Angka), is a language of Arunachal Pradesh India. Long assumed to be a Sino-Tibetan language, it may actually be a language isolate. It is spoken by 3,000 people in 21 villages in Thrizino Circle, West Kameng District. The Hruso people inhabit areas of South East Kameng and are concentrated in the Bichom River Valley, and speak English, Hindi, and Miji in addition to Hruso.

Bangru (Ləvai), spoken on the Tibetan border, might be related to Hruso, but it seems more likely that it is a dialect of Miji.

Locations
According to the Ethnologue, Hruso is spoken in the following villages of Thrizino circle, West Kameng district, Arunachal Pradesh.

 
Jamiri
Husigaon
Gohainthan
Buragaon
Karangonia
Raindogonia
Yayom
Gijiri
Dijungonia
Tulu
Palatari
Raghupam
Tania
Khuppi
Bhalukpong
Balipho
Palizi

Hruso is also spoken in Pisang village, Seppa circle, East Kameng district.

Status
Ethnologue lists the language as 6b, or "threatened".

Dialects/varieties

The book Hruso by Robert Shafer, notes the two dialects that Hruso is divided into.  The first one is known to be recorded by Campbell and the second dialect is known to be recorded by Anderson, Hesslmeyer, and Payne.  Also Dialect A has some differentiation in vocabulary when compared to Dialect B. Dialect A is also known to be briefly recorded and is more archaic than dialect B which has very little recording evidence behind it.

Dialects A
1 Anderson hhu, k' k'ii "water ", Hess. xu. And. diaha (p. 9), diak'a (17) " to-morrow ". And. yo " to-day ", ya " now ". And. k'sesi " goat " (6), k's8 (18), H. kisie, P. k'esi, k'isi. Camp. gle " foot ", P. -ksi, si-, si, And. -si, H. si. 2 To chew; p. 17, to eat. 3 In na-yu "ear emerald ". 4 The consonant seems to be palatalized in this root in some languages and the vowel perhaps umlauted, both perhaps due to the following *-s. But these languages are too poorly recorded to form a basis for a conclusion.

References

Blench, Roger. 2018. The Hruso language: grammar sketch and wordlist.

External links
 Endangered Languages.com
 Simon, I.M. (1993) Aka language guide
ELAR collection: Documentation and Description of the Hrusso Aka Language of Arunachal Pradesh deposited by Vijay D'Souza

Hrusish languages
Languages of India
Endangered languages of India
Language isolates of Asia